Jimmy Jewell may refer to:

 Jimmy Jewell (association football) (1898–1952), English football manager
 Jimmy Jewel (1909–1995), English comedian and actor
 Jimmy Jewell (saxophonist) (born 1945), British saxophonist 
 Jimmy Jewell (climber) (1953–1987), British rock climber

See also
 Jewell (surname)
 James Jewell (disambiguation)